Leptomyrmex neotropicus is an extinct species of Miocene ant in the genus Leptomyrmex. Described by Baroni Urbani in 1980, a total of 10 workers of this species were found in a single block of Dominican amber.

References

†
†
Fossil taxa described in 1980
Miocene insects
Fossil ant taxa